Miau is a realistic novel by Spanish writer Benito Pérez Galdós, released in 1888. It tells a story about a lower-middle class family of Madrid in the 19th century. The main character is Ramón Villaamil, an ex-employee from the Ministry of Economy and Finance. He lives with his wife doña Pura, his sister-in-law Milagros, his daughter Abelarda, his grandson Luis Cadalso, and his detestable son-in-law Víctor Cadalso. Víctor's wife, Luisa Villaamil, who is dead, was the mother of Luis.

Miau is the Spanish onomatopoeia for the sound made by cats, but it also stands for: Moralidad, Income tax, Aduanas y Unificación de la deuda (morality, income tax, customs and unification of the debt), the four main ideas of Villaamil to improve the ministry administration.

Novels by Benito Pérez Galdós
1888 novels
19th-century Spanish novels